Li Chen or Li Zhen is a sculptor. He was born in 1963 in Yunlin County, Taiwan.

Early life and education
Li attended Taichung Municipal Dajia Senior High School. Before joining Taiwan's mandatory military service, Li took up a position in the workshop of local sculptor Hsieh Tung-liang where he studied body sculpture.

Career 
Two of Li’s early art series The Beauty of Emptiness and Energy of Emptiness use simple minimalist lines that create an aesthetic of emptiness to reinterpreted the image of Buddha statues. In the Spiritual Journey Through the Great Ether series,  Li is less limited by tradition, inventing a technique that incorporates gold and silver leaf on the exterior of his bronze sculptures. 

Soul Guardians was inspired by Li's reflections on the occurrence of natural disasters over almost a decade. He takes the main character of a myth as his creative focus as he discusses the significance of "God" for humanity. This was followed by The Beacon: When Night Light Glimmers series, which took a "special light" as its creative core. 

More recently, Li has reflected on human nature in his creative works: the Ordinary People series in 2010 demonstrates his spiritual contemplation. The 2011 series Immortality of Fate, which is one of Li's "virtual" series, utilizes wood, rope and ceramic clay to convey his awareness of the changeability of cause and effect in life. In the same year, Li also produced the Ethereal Cloud series, the first time he showed cast stainless steel pieces. 

Li's auction record is HKD.11,190,000 for a sculpture "Dragon-Riding Buddha" created in 2001, set at China Guardian, Hong Kong, on 7 October 2019.

Series 
The Beauty of Emptiness (1992–1997)
Energy of Emptiness (1998–2000)
Spiritual Journey Through the Great Ether (2001–)
Soul Guardians (2008–2009)
Immortality (2008–)
The Beacon (2009–2010)
Ordinary People (2010–)
Ethereal Cloud (2011–)

Exhibitions

Solo exhibitions
2019 Ethereal Cloud – Li Chen New Works, Asia Art Center, Beijing, China
2018 Through the Ages - Li Chen Solo Exhibition, Aurora Museum, Shanghai, China
2017 Being: In/Voluntary Drift - Li Chen Solo Exhibition, Museum of Contemporary Art, Taipei, Taiwan
2014-15 Journey of Solitary Existence: Li Chen's "Ordinary People" Series Debut Exhibition, Asia Art Center, Beijing, China
2013–14 Discovery Channel's documentary "Chineseness", Taipei, Taiwan
2013	 Li Chen 2013 Place Vendôme Premiere Sculpture Exhibition in Paris
2012	 Li Chen: Eternity and Commoner, Frye Art Museum, Seattle
2011	 Greatness of Spirit: Li Chen Premiere Sculpture Exhibition in Taiwan, Taipei
2010	 The Beacon– When Night Light Glimmers, ShContemporary 10, Shanghai
2009	 Li Chen: Mind‧Body‧Spirit, Singapore Art Museum, Singapore
2008	 Soul Guardians- Li Chen Solo Show, Asia Art Center, Beijing
In Search of Spiritual Space, National Museum of China, Beijing
2007	 Energy of Emptiness, 52nd International Art Exhibition – La Biennale di Venezia, Venice
2005	 Li Chen Sculpture, Art Taipei 2005, Taipei
2003	 Spiritual Journey Through the Great Ether, Michael Goedhuis Gallery, New York
2001	 Delights of Ordinary People, River Art Gallery, Taichung
2000	 The Transformation of Emptiness – Boundary within Boundary, Art Taipei 2000, Taipei
1999	 Energy of Emptiness, Art Taipei, Taipei

Selected international group exhibitions
2019 Buddha．China-Buddhist Objects in the Early Stage from the Gansu Provincial Museum, Suzhou, China
2015 Rest on Water and Gargle with Stone: Chinese Contemporary Literati Art, Beijing, China
2013 Culture. Mind. Becoming, 55th International Art Exhibition La Biennale di Venezia, Italy
2011 Splendid Ethics, Interalia Art Company, Seoul
2010 Spirit of the East II – Bridging, Asia Art Center, Beijing
Korea International Art Fair, Seoul, Korea
2009 The 4th International Cultural & Creative Industry Expo, Beijing
 09, Hong Kong
2008 Spirit of the East I- Accumulations, Asia Art Center, Beijing
The Origin: The first Annual Moon River Sculpture Festival, Moon River Museum of Contemporary Art, Beijing
2007 China Onward: Chinese Contemporary Art 1966–2006, The Louisiana Museum of Modern Art, Copenhagen
OPENASIA, 10th International Exhibition of Sculptures and Installations, Venice
The Power of the Universe – Exhibition of Frontier, Contemporary Chinese Art, Asia Art Center, Beijing
Exploration and Revolution of images in reality by the 14 contemporary Chinese Artists, Doosan Art Center, Seoul
TOP 10 Chinese Contemporary Sculpture Exhibition, Asia Art Center, Beijing
China Onward: Chinese Contemporary Art, 1966–2006, Israel Museum, Jerusalem
2006 ARTSingapore, Singapore
Art Taipei, Taipei
2005 Shanghai International Biennial Urban Sculpture Exhibition, Shanghai
China International Gallery Exposition, Beijing
Shanghai Art Fair, Shanghai
ARTSingapore, Singapore
2004 OPENASIA, 7th International Exhibition of Sculptures and Installations, Venice
Fiction Love– Ultra New Vision in Contemporary Art, Museum of Contemporary Art, Taipei
China International Gallery Exposition, Beijing
Shanghai Art Fair, Shanghai
2003 Art Chicago, Chicago
International Contemporary Art Fair, New York
2002 Art Palm Beach, Florida
Art Chicago, Chicago
International Fine Art Fair, Houston
2001 China without Borders, headquarters of Sotheby's, New York
Asian Art Fair, Paris
Salon de Mars Art Fair, Geneva, Switzerland
Art Chicago, Chicago
The International Asian Art Fair, New York

Publications 
Through the Ages-Li Chen, Aurora Museum and Asia Art Center, 2019, 
Being: In/Voluntary Drift - Li Chen Solo Exhibition, MOCA Taipei, 2018, 
La Légèreté Monumentale de Li Chen, Asia Art Center, 2014, 
Greatness of Spirit: Li Chen Premiere Sculpture Exhibition in Taiwan, Asia Art Center, 2012, 
Li Chen: The Beacon Series: When Night Light Glimmers, Asia Art Center, 2010, 
Li Chen: Mind．Body．Spirit, Singapore Art Museum & Asia Art Center, 2009, 
Li Chen: Soul Guardians-In an Age of Disasters and Calamities, Asia Art Center, 2009, 
Li Chen in Beijing – Solo Exhibition at National Art Museum of China – In Search of Spiritual Space, Asia Art Center, 2008, 
Li Chen in Venice, Asia Art Center, 2007, 
Li Chen 1992–2002 Sculpture, Asia Art Center, 2004,

References

External links
Discovery Channel's documentary trailer "Chineseness-Li Chen"
Installation of Li Chen: Eternity and Commoner, Seattle, USA
2011 Greatness of Spirit: Li Chen Premiere Sculpture Exhibition in Taiwan
Li Chen Sculpture Exhibition at Chiang Kai-Shek Memorial Hall, Taipei, Taiwan
TVBS news coverage on 2011 Greatness of Spirit: Li Chen Premiere Sculpture Exhibition in Taiwan
2009 Mind．Body．Spirit at Singapore Art Museum
Li Chen at Yang Gallery, Singapore and Beijing

1963 births
Taiwanese sculptors
Taiwanese contemporary artists
Living people